Slindile Nodangala (born June 23, 1972) is a South African actress most famous for acting as Ruby Dikobe, a shebeen queen in the soap, Generations, where her father is Sompisi (Tiki Nxumalo).

Personal life
Nodangala grew up in Durban and was raised by her grandmother, who died in 1997, and her older siblings. When she was younger she was trained by Gibson Kente. Nodangala was also an active member of her church choir. She was involved in a car accident and suffered injuries to her leg and was hospitalised for three months. She has two children born in 1996 and 2001.

Career

Music
Nodangala was a backing vocalist for Stimela between 1994 and 1995.

Acting
Nodangala had an understudy role in London at the Lyceum Theatre in 2001. She toured the world in five years to places like China, Taipei, Beijing, Shanghai, Malaysia, Beirut and Scandinavia meeting personalities like Prince Charles, Prince Edward, Tim Rice, Shirley Bassey, Elton John and the Prince of Jordan. Nodangala had a starring role on Generations between June 2011 and December 2014. She also featured in award-winning South African movie Izulu lami in 2008 and The Lion King musical.
She joined the now-cancelled e.tv soap opera ,  Rhythm City in 2017. She currently playing Nomvula Khubeka on eTV daily soap opera , Scandal!. In 2022 she joined the soap opera The River as Nolwazi Dlamini the sister of Lindiwe and Veronica Dlamini

References

External links

1972 births
Living people
South African actresses
Actors from Durban